Capricornio was a Spanish satellite launch vehicle developed by the Instituto Nacional de Técnica Aeroespacial (INTA) in the 1990s. It was expected to be a low cost solution to place up to 70 kg payloads into 600 km polar orbits or 60 to 140 kg payloads into low Earth orbit. The Capricornio program was cancelled in 2000.

Development
 First phase: development of solid motors using the INTA-100 and INTA-300 sounding rockets, launched from the El Arenosillo test range in southern Spain.
 Second phase: use Capricornio second and third stages as the Argo sounding rocket (originally planned for winter 1998-99).
 Third phase: first launch of the full Capricornio rocket, carrying a micro-satellite.

Configuration
Three-stage solid propellant launcher. Overall length of 18.25 m, body diameter of 1.0 m and weighs 15,035 kg at launch.

 Stage 1 contains a Thiokol Castor 4B motor with HTPB solid propellant.
 Stage 2 contains a motor named Deneb-F.
 Stage 3 contains a motor named Mizar-B.

Projected flights
The first flight of Capricornio was scheduled to take place from El Hierro Launch Centre in late 1999 or 2000. It would carry two small satellites: Nanosat 01 (developed by the Polytechnic University of Madrid) and Venus (Polytechnic University of Madrid and other universities in Mexico and Argentina).

See also

References

Space launch vehicles of Spain
Instituto Nacional de Técnica Aeroespacial
Expendable space launch systems
Space launch vehicles of Europe